The Haparanda archipelago is a group of 792 Swedish islands in the north part of the Bay of Bothnia. The islands are used for recreation in the summer months. They are icebound during the winter.

Location

The north of the bay of Bothnia contains a large archipelago area.
The islands in the Swedish sector make up the Norrbotten archipelago.
It is divided into the archipelagos of Piteå (550 islands), Luleå (1,312 islands), Kalix (792 islands) and Haparanda (652 islands).
As a result, the islands are growing in size but the waters and harbors are becoming shallower.

The Swedish Haparanda Archipelago National Park lies within the Haparanda group of islands. It includes the larger islands of Sandskär and Seskar Furö, and some smaller islands and skerries. All of these islands have emerged in the last 1,500 years as the bed of the bay has risen.
Some of the other islands in Haparanda archipelago include Hanhinkari, Kataja, Seskarö, Skomakaren, Stora Hamnskär, Stora Hepokari and Torne-Furö.

Kataja is divided between Sweden and Finland. The border was established in 1809 between two islands, a larger Swedish one called Kataja and a smaller Finnish one called Inakari. In the years since then, post-glacial rebound has caused the land in the region to rise relative to sea level, joining the two islands.

Climate

The waters around the archipelago are brackish, with less the 10% of the salt content of the Atlantic.
The sea freezes in January and remain frozen until March–April.

See also
List of islands of the Haparanda archipelago

References
Citations

Sources

Swedish islands in the Baltic
Archipelagoes of Sweden
Landforms of Norrbotten County